A patu is a generic term for a club or pounder used by the Māori, the indigenous people of New Zealand.

Patu may also refer to:
 Patu (spider), genus of spiders in the family Symphytognathidae
 Kalateh-ye Mir Hasan, village in Iran also known as Patu
 Te Pātū, Māori tribe
 Police Anti-Terrorist Unit of the British South Africa Police in the Rhodesian Bush War